Albert's swarm was an immense concentration of the Rocky Mountain locust that swarmed the Western United States in 1875.

The 1875 swarm is referred to repeatedly in a western Missouri historical record that explains:
It was the year 1875 that will long be remembered by the people of at least four states, as the grasshopper year. The scourge struck Western Missouri April, 1875, and commenced devastating some of the fairest portions of our noble commonwealth. They gave Henry [County] an earnest and overwhelming visitation, and demonstrated with an amazing rapidity that their appetite was voracious, and that everything green belonged to them for their sustenance.

One estimate numbers the locusts in the swarm at 3.5 trillion. Another estimate numbers the swarm at 12.5 trillion, which is the greatest concentration of animals ever speculatively guessed, according to Guinness World Records.

See Also 

 Locust Plague of 1874

References

1875 natural disasters
Natural disasters in the United States
Natural disasters in Colorado
Natural disasters in Kansas
Natural disasters in Missouri
Natural disasters in Nebraska
Locust swarms
1875 natural disasters in the United States